The 94th Infantry Regiment (94e régiment d’infanterie or 94e RI) is a French Army regiment. It originated in 1709 as a German regiment in the French army known as the régiment Royal-Bavière. From 1780 to 1791 it was known as the régiment Royal-Hesse-Darmstadt. It is the inheritor of the traditions of the French Imperial Guard and thus is also known as the Grenadiers de la Garde or La Garde rather than by its number. In addition to its traditions being from the Imperial Guard, their beret insignia is that of a French Imperial Eagle. After having been dissolved in 1993 following the reorganization of the French army in 1993, it was reformed in 2005. Retaining its name and traditions, it is now the regiment in the French army that specializes in urban combat (Combat en Zone Urbain or CENZUB in French).

References 

 Paul Martin, « Le Régiment Royal Hesse-Darmstadt », L'Essor, 77

 

 
 
 

Infantry regiments of France
Regiments of the French First Republic
Regiments of the First French Empire
20th-century regiments of France
Military units and formations disestablished in 1993
Military units and formations established in 1791